The highest ranking civil servant is the Chief of the Cabinet Secretariat of the People's Republic of Bangladesh who is also the Cabinet Secretary. He is ex-officio Chairman of the Superior Selection Board and head of all civil services under the rules of business of the Government of Bangladesh. He also holds the 12th position in the Warrant of Precedence of Bangladesh. Cabinet Secretary is appointed from Bangladesh Civil Service (Administration) Cadre, known as Bangladesh Administrative Service.

The current Cabinet Secretary of the Republic is Md. Mahbub Hossain. He is the 24th Cabinet Secretary to the government of Bangladesh.

List of Cabinet Secretaries
The position holder is accountable for ensuring that the Civil Service is equipped with the skills and capability to meet the everyday challenges it faces and that civil servants work in a fair and decent environment.

References

Government of Bangladesh
Civil service in Bangladesh